Rossana San Juan (born 30 August 1969 in Acaponeta, Nayarit, Mexico) is a Mexican actress and singer who has participated in various productions, both movies and soap operas. She has a degree in Neuroscience and a BA in Communication Sciences, even has an office where she sees patients in need as a psychoanalyst.

Filmography

References

External links

Esmas

1969 births
Living people
Mexican telenovela actresses
Mexican television actresses
Mexican film actresses
Mexican women singers
Actresses from Guerrero
Singers from Guerrero
20th-century Mexican actresses
21st-century Mexican actresses
People from Chilpancingo